This article about records of members of parliament of the United Kingdom and of England includes a variety of lists of MPs by age, period and other circumstances of service, familiar sets, ethnic or religious minorities, physical attributes, and circumstances of their deaths.

Age

Youngest

Prior to the Acts of Union, the youngest known person to have sat in the House of Commons of England was Christopher Monck, elected MP for Devon in 1667, "probably without a contest", at the age of 13. He sat in the House for three years, before being elevated to the House of Lords upon his father's death. He is said to have been "moderately active during his short period of membership, sitting on seven committees".

Monck was one of many members returned underage in the late seventeenth century, with around ten underage members in each of the Parliaments of 1690 and 1695, many aristocrats. In response to this, the Parliamentary Elections Act 1695 established 21 as the minimum age, although this was not reliably enforced. Until the Reform Act 1832, underage MPs were seldom unseated. For example, Charles James Fox became an MP aged 19 in 1768, and Robert Jocelyn, Viscount Jocelyn, became an MP aged 18 in 1806.

Before the general election of 2015, the youngest MP since the Reform Act of 1832 was William Charles Wentworth-FitzWilliam, elected at Malton in the 1832 general election aged 20 and 11 months. His election, whilst theoretically illegal, was unchallenged; Malton was a pocket borough controlled by his family, and the matter was viewed as academic as he would be of full age by the time Parliament assembled.

After Wentworth-FitzWilliam, the youngest MP elected was James Dickson, who was elected as a Liberal at a by-election for the Borough of Dungannon on 25 June 1880. He was born on 19 April 1859, and so was aged 21 years 67 days. The youngest female MP was Bernadette Devlin, elected on 17 April 1969 from Mid Ulster, aged 21 years 359 days. Until 1970, the minimum age to sit in parliament was 21. In 1970, the minimum age was lowered to 18. Both records are now jointly held by Mhairi Black, who was aged 20 years and 237 days old at the time of her election to the seat of Paisley and Renfrewshire South in the 2015 general election.

Oldest
The oldest serving MP whose exact dates are known was Samuel Young (1822–1918), who was MP for East Cavan from 1892 (when aged 70), until his death at the age of 96 years 63 days.

Oldest debuts
Perhaps the oldest parliamentary debut of all time was that of Warren Lisle, believed born in 1695, who was elected on 7 September 1780 during that year's general election as MP for Weymouth and Melcombe Regis as locum tenens, aged reportedly 85. He stood down on 21 November to allow his kinsman, Gabriel Steward, to stand for the seat after completing his own term as mayor of the borough (when he had been the local returning officer). He died in July 1788 aged reportedly 93.

The oldest debut where a confirmed birth date is known was made by Sir Robert Pullar (born 18 February 1828) who was elected at an unopposed by-election for Perth on 12 February 1907 aged 78 years and 359 days. He retired at the January 1910 general election.

The oldest debut at a general election to the UK Parliament was possibly by Bernard Kelly (born 1808) who was elected MP for South Donegal in 1885 in the year of his 77th birthday. He died in office on 1 January 1887 aged 78.

The oldest woman at first entry to the Commons was Dr Ethel Bentham (born 5 January 1861) who was elected MP for Islington East at the 1929 general election aged 68 years and 145 days. She died in office, the first woman to do so, in 1931.

Mick Whitley was the oldest MP first elected at the last general election, the 2019 general election, at age 68.

David Hacking was the oldest hereditary peer elected to the House of Lords in a by-election, aged 83 in 2021.

List of oldest sitting MPs since 1945

Notes:
F Also Father of the House (not necessarily contemporaneous with seniority)
1 Died in office
2 Retired
3 Defeated when seeking re-election

Longest-lived MP
Although his alleged birth year predates parish registers and civil birth registration, William Badger, who was member for Winchester in the 1597 parliament of England, is supported by a History of Parliament biographer to have been a centenarian, being established to have been born 'circa 1523' and to have been buried on 18 January 1629, aged at least 105 years.

Ronald Atkins (13 June 1916 – 30 December 2020), member for Preston North from 1966 to 1970, and again from 1974 to 1979, was the longest-lived former MP whose birth date is registered. His daughter Charlotte Atkins also served as an MP from 1997 to 2010. On 30 August 2018, he surpassed the previous record set by Theodore Cooke Taylor (3 August 1850 – 19 October 1952), member for Radcliffe-cum-Farnworth from 1900 to 1918, who had lived to be 102 years and 77 days old. Atkins died aged 104 years and 200 days old.

Other ex-MPs who have reached their centenary are Nathaniel Micklem (1853–1954), Sir Harry Brittain (1873–1974), Sir George Ernest Schuster (1881–1982), Manny Shinwell (1884–1986), Edgar Granville (1898–1998), Jack Oldfield (1899–1999, who outlived his parliamentary service by 68 years), Hartley Shawcross (1902–2003), Bert Hazell (1907–2009), Michael Shaw (1920–2021) and Sir Patrick Duffy (born 1920, and the only centenarian former MP currently living).

Frank James, who was elected MP for Walsall at the 1892 general election, but unseated on petition in November that year, died at 102 years and 135 days old; James's record was surpassed by Atkins on 27 October 2018.

, Sir Patrick Duffy is the oldest living former MP (born 17 June 1920, age ).

Jill Knight (9 July 1923 – 6 April 2022) was the longest-lived female former MP, aged 98 years, 271 days.

 Elizabeth Shields is the oldest living female former MP (born 27 February 1928, age ).

John Morris (born 5 November 1931, age ) and Stratton Mills (born 1 July 1932, age ), who were elected MP for Aberavon and Belfast North respectively at the 1959 general election, are the earliest elected former MPs still living. Morris was sworn in on 21 October, Mills on 22 October.

Shortest-lived MPs
One known contender for this record for whom both birth and death dates are known, in the Parliament of England, was James Wriothesley, Lord Wriothesley, who while still a minor was MP for Callington in 1621–1622, and for Winchester from early in 1624 until his death from illness on military service in the Netherlands on 1 November 1624 aged 19 years and 251 days.

Based only on evidence from his university entrance records, Peter Legh, MP for Newton from 1640, may have been aged 19 or younger when he died after a duel on 2 February 1642, but his precise birthdate is not known.

Geoffrey Palmer, MP for Ludgershall from March 1660, died in office on 31 October 1661 aged 19 years and at least 245 days, based on his baptism registration (28 February 1642).

After the setting of the youngest age of candidacy at 21, the youngest MP to die in office was George Charles Grey who was elected MP for Berwick-upon-Tweed in 1941 and was killed in action on 30 July 1944 aged 25 years 240 days. Throughout this period he was the Baby of the House.

The shortest-lived female MP, Lady Cynthia Mosley, MP for Stoke 1929–1931, died in 1933 aged 34. The youngest female MP to die in office was Jo Cox, MP for Batley and Spen since 2015, who was murdered on 16 June 2016, 6 days before her 42nd birthday.

Period of service

Longest

Sir Francis Knollys (also the oldest ever sitting MP) was first elected as MP for Oxford in 1575 at the age of around 25 and was MP for Reading at the time of his death in 1648, a period spanning 73 years, although there were eight periods, amounting to 27 entire years (1590–1592, 1594–1596, 1599–1600, 1602–1603, 1605–1613, 1615–1619, 1627 and 1630–1639) in which the Parliament of England did not meet, and his period of service totalled little more than 23 years.

The longest span of service of an MP since the start of the 20th century was Winston Churchill who was first elected on 1 October 1900 and left the House of Commons on 25 September 1964, a period of 63 years 360 days. His service was not continuous, as he was not an MP for a spell in 1908 and between 1922 and 1924.

Charles Pelham Villiers was the longest continuously serving MP. He was elected in 1835 and remained an MP continuously for over 62 years until his death on 16 January 1898, aged 96 years 13 days. Since the start of the 20th century, the longest continuous service by an MP has been 51 years 80 days by Edward Heath, who sat from 1950 to 2001.

The longest continuous service record for a female MP is held by Harriet Harman, first elected in October 1982. The longest total service record for a female MP is held by Dame Margaret Beckett, who served for 4 years and 7 months between 1974 and 1979 and was then re-elected in June 1983. Beckett also holds the record for the longest span of service for a woman.

Shortest
There are cases of MPs being elected posthumously; Edward Legge (1710–1747) was elected unopposed as MP for Portsmouth on 15 December 1747, four days before news arrived that he had died 87 days previously in the West Indies. In 1780 John Kirkman was elected as MP for the City of London despite dying before polls closed.

In more recent times, members have died after polling, but before the declaration of the results. In 1906, Thomas Higgins was declared elected for the seat of North Galway, even though he had died earlier that morning, after polling day. More recently, in 1945 Sir Edward Taswell Campbell at Bromley and Leslie Pym at Monmouth died after polling, but nine days before the declaration of the results. Both were declared elected posthumously, and both had been MPs for a number of years. Noel Skelton is another example in 1935.

The shortest non-posthumous service was that of Alfred Dobbs, who was declared elected MP for Smethwick on 26 July 1945 and was killed the following day in a car accident on the way to take his seat.

The shortest service for women MPs has been 92 days in the case of both Ruth Dalton, who was MP for Bishop Auckland from a by-election on 7 February 1929 to dissolution of Parliament on 10 May 1929 prior to that year's general election, and Margo MacDonald, who was MP for Glasgow Govan from a by-election on 8 November 1973 until the dissolution of Parliament on 8 February 1974 prior to the coming general election.

Shortest total service since 1900
For a comprehensive list of MPs since 1900 with less than 365 days total service see
 List of United Kingdom MPs with the shortest service

Members who never took their seats
 John Finucane a, 2019–
 Órfhlaith Begley a, 2018–
 Chris Hazzard a, 2017–
 Elisha McCallion a, 2017–2019
 Barry McElduff a, 2017–2018
 Mickey Brady a, 2015–
 Francie Molloy a, 2013–
 Paul Maskey a, 2011–
 Michelle Gildernew a, 2001–2015, 2017–
 Pat Doherty a, 2001–2017
 Conor Murphy  a, 2005–2015
 Martin McGuinness a, 1997–2013
 Gerry Adams a, 1983–1992, 1997–2011
 Owen Carron a, 1981–1983
 Bobby Sands bc, 1981
 Philip Clarke abd, 1955
 Tom Mitchell abd, 1955
 Alfred Dobbs c, 1945
 Joseph Bell c, 1922
 Harry Wrightson c, 1918–1919
 69 Sinn Féin Members elected at the 1918 general election (including 6 first elected in by-elections 1917–1918) a
 James Annand c, 1906
 Thomas Higgins e, 1906
 Henry Compton f, 1905–1906 (shortest serving MP – 46 days – whose tenure was not ended by his death)
 Joseph Andrews f, 1905–1906

Notes:
a Abstentionist
b In prison at time of election
c Died before taking seat
d Ruled ineligible
e Elected posthumously
f By-election win was superseded by subsequent general election, without Parliament sitting in the meantime

MPs who never won an election
On rare occasions the election winner may be disqualified, either by an election court or by the House of Commons, and the seat awarded to the runner-up.
Malcolm St. Clair: Bristol South-East, 1961–63
Charles Beattie: Mid-Ulster, 1955–56

MPs elected to two or more constituencies simultaneously
 Charles Stewart Parnell: elected in 1880 General election for three separate seats – Cork City, Mayo and Meath.
 Richard Hazleton: from 9 December 1910 until 23 February 1911, when he was unseated on a petition from the second seat, he was MP for North Galway and North Louth.
 At the 1918 election, 4 Sinn Féin candidates were each elected to two seats: Arthur Griffith (Cavan East and Tyrone North West), Éamon de Valera (Clare East and Mayo East), Liam Mellows (Galway East and Meath North) and Eoin MacNeill (Londonderry City and National University of Ireland). However, none of them took their seat in the House of Commons, instead attending the First Dáil.

MPs who have sat for three or more different constituencies
In modern times, it is unusual for an MP to represent more than one or two constituencies during their career, although before the 20th century it was quite common. MPs whose seats were altered purely by boundary changes are not listed.
Michael Ancram: Berwick and East Lothian 1; Edinburgh South 1; Devizes 5
Ralph Assheton: Rushcliffe 1; City of London 2; Blackburn West 5
Walter Ayles: Bristol North1; Southall 4; Hayes and Harlington 3
Kenneth Baker: Acton 1; St. Marylebone 2; Mole Valley 5
Arthur Balfour: Hertford 4; Manchester East 1; City of London 1
Joseph Braithwaite: Hillsborough 1; Holderness 2; Bristol North West 1
James, Lord Brudenell: Marlborough; Fowey 2; North Northamptonshire 5
John Calcraft (the younger): Wareham 4; Rochester 4; Dorset 10
Winston Churchill: Oldham 4; Manchester North West 1; Dundee 1; Epping 2 Woodford 2
William Clark: Nottingham South 1; East Surrey 4; Croydon South 5
Roger Conant: Chesterfield 1; Bewdley 2; Rutland and Stamford 5
Geoffrey de Freitas: Nottingham Central 4; Lincoln 3; Kettering 5
Benjamin Disraeli: Maidstone 4; Shrewsbury 4; Buckinghamshire 6 
Walter Elliot: Lanark1; Kelvingrove1; Combined Scottish Universities 2; Kelvingrove 10
George Galloway: Glasgow Hillhead/Kelvin 4; Bethnal Green and Bow 4; Bradford West 1
William Ewart Gladstone: Newark 1; Oxford University 1; South Lancashire 2; Greenwich 4; Midlothian 5
Thomas Graves: Okehampton 4; Windsor 4; Milborne Port 5
Arthur Griffith-Boscawen: Tunbridge 1; Dudley 1; Taunton 1
Ray Gunter: South-East Essex 2; Doncaster 1; Southwark 3
Edward Hemmerde: East Denbighshire 4; North West Norfolk 2; Crewe 1
Arthur Henderson: Barnard Castle 4; Widnes 1; Newcastle East 1; Burnley 1; Clay Cross 10
Austin Hudson: Islington East 1; Hackney North 1; Lewisham North 10
Roy Jenkins: Southwark Central 2; Birmingham Stechford 3; Glasgow Hillhead 1
Harcourt Johnstone Willesden West 1; South Shields 1; Middlesbrough West 10
William Jowitt: Hartlepool 1; Preston 4; Ashton-under-Lyne 6
Richard Kidston Law: Kingston upon Hull South West 1; Kensington South 2; Haltemprice 6
Geoffrey Lloyd: Birmingham Ladywood 1; Birmingham King's Norton 2; Sutton Coldfield 5
Walter Long: Wiltshire North 2; Devizes 1; Liverpool West Derby 4; Bristol South 4; Dublin County South 4; Strand 2; Westminster St George's 6
Sir Manasseh Masseh Lopes: New Romney 3; Evesham 9; Barnstaple 9, Westbury 3
Leonard Lyle: Stratford 1; Epping 5; Bournemouth 6
Charles MacAndrew: Kilmarnock 1; Glasgow Partick 4; Bute and North Ayrshire 5
Ramsay MacDonald: Leicester 2; Aberavon 4; Seaham 1; Combined Scottish Universities 10
James Patrick Mahon: Clare 8; Ennis 1; County Carlow 10
Lord John Manners: Newark 1; Colchester 4; North Leicestershire 4; Melton 6
Frank Markham: Chatham 5; Nottingham South 1; Buckingham 5
Fergus Montgomery: Newcastle East 1; Brierley Hill 2; Altrincham and Sale 2
Hyacinth Morgan: Camberwell North West 5; Rochdale 4; Warrington 5
John Fletcher Moulton: Clapham 1 South Hackney 1, Launceston 5
Wilfred Paling: Doncaster 1; Wentworth 2; Dearne Valley 5
Arthur Palmer: Wimbledon 1; Cleveland 1; Bristol Central 2; Bristol North East 2
Sir Robert Peel: Cashel 4; Chippenham 4; Oxford University 4; Westbury 4; Tamworth 10
Charles Simmons: Birmingham Erdington1; Birmingham West 2; Brierley Hill 1
Frank Soskice: Birkenhead East 2; Sheffield Neepsend 2; Newport 5
John Strachey: Aston 1; Dundee 2, Dundee West 10
Earl Gower: St Mawes 4; Newcastle-Under-Lyme 4; Staffordshire 5
Shirley Williams: Hitchin 2; Hertford and Stevenage 1; Crosby 1
John Wilmot: Fulham East 1; Kennington 4; Deptford 5
Sir Joseph Yorke: Reigate 7; Saint Germans 3; Sandwich 4 Reigate 10

Notes:
1 defeated
2 seat abolished
3 resigned
4 sought another constituency
5 retired
6 inherited/raised to peerage
7 resigned but returned to constituency at later date
8 unseated on petition; elected at a later date, then retired
9 unseated for bribery
10 died

MPs who have made more than one comeback
In modern times, it is unusual for an MP who has been defeated (or retired e.g. due to their seat being abolished) to achieve more than one comeback to the House of Commons after a period of absence. In the UK Parliament, William Vesey-FitzGerald, Lord Charles Beresford and Arthur Henderson were exceptional in achieving it on no fewer than four occasions each: Vesey-FitzGerald over a span of 18 years through three by-elections and one general election, Beresford over a span of 25 years after voluntarily resigning or retiring from the House at stages of his naval career, Henderson invariably at by-elections following serial general election defeats in previous seats, in the shorter span of 14 years. A woman has never come back more than once. Note that George Galloway transferred to a different constituency and party in 2005 but did not have any period of absence from the Commons at that time. Having left Parliament in 2010 he made a comeback at a by-election in a third constituency in 2012.
William McCrea: 2000 b, 2005
Michael Ancram: 1979, 1992
Fergus Montgomery: 1967 b, October 1974
Tony Benn: 1963 b, 1984 b
Arthur Palmer: 1952 b, 1964
Alec Douglas-Home: 1950, 1963 b
Frank Soskice: 1950 b, 1956 b
Richard Law: 1945 b, 1951
Frank Markham: 1935, 1951
Sir Herbert Williams: 1932 b, 1950
Cahir Healy: 1931 b, 1950
Harold Macmillan: 1931, 1945 b
Ian Fraser: 1931, 1940 b
Harcourt Johnstone: 1931, 1940 b
Cuthbert Headlam: 1931, 1940 b
Gwilym Lloyd George: 1929, 1951
Walter Ayles: 1929, 1945
Somerville Hastings: 1929, 1945
George Isaacs: 1929, 1939 b
William Jowitt: 1929, 1939 b
James Chuter Ede: 1929, 1935
Herbert Morrison: 1929, 1935
Robert Richards: 1929, 1935
Arthur Henderson Jr.: 1929, 1935
Benjamin Walter Gardner: 1929, 1934 b
Tom Smith: 1929, 1933 b
William Wedgwood Benn: 1928 b, 1937 b
Manny Shinwell: 1928 b, 1935
Austin Hudson: 1924, 1950
Walter Elliot: 1924, 1946 b
Edward Cadogan: 1924, 1940 b
Lord Erskine: 1924, 1940 b
Tom Johnston: 1924 b, 1935
Andrew MacLaren: 1924, 1935
Alec Cunningham-Reid: 1924, 1932b
Archibald Boyd-Carpenter: 1924, 1931
Sir Geoffrey Ellis: 1924, 1931
Arthur Evans, 1924, 1931
Park Goff, 1924, 1931
Vivian Henderson: 1924, 1931
George Hume: 1924, 1931
Frank Sanderson: 1924, 1931
Wilfred Sugden: 1924, 1931
Charles Lyle: 1923, 1940 b
Tom Kennedy: 1923, 1935
Thomas Ellis Naylor: 1923, 1935
Francis Dyke Acland: 1923, 1932 b
Walter Rea: 1923, 1931
John Edmund Mills: 1923, 1929
Walter Robert Smith: 1923, 1929
Henry Guest: 1922, 1937 b
Ramsay MacDonald: 1922, 1936 b
Charles Roden Buxton: 1922, 1929
Fred Jowett: 1922, 1929
Hastings Lees-Smith: 1922, 1924, 1935
John Edward Sutton: 1922 b, 1923
Arthur Henderson, Sr.: 1919 b, 1923 b, 1924 b, 1933 b
Edward Hemmerde: 1912 b, 1922
Geoffrey Howard: 1911 b, 1923
Charles Masterman: 1911 b, 1923
Sir James Millar: 1911 b, 1922, 1929
Sir Donald Maclean: December 1910, 1929
Edward Anthony Strauss: December 1910, 1927 b, 1931
Sir Hamar Greenwood: December 1910, 1924
Frederick Guest: December 1910, 1923, 1931
Leif Jones: December 1910, 1923, 1929
William Mitchell-Thomson: December 1910, 1923
Arthur Griffith-Boscawen: December 1910, 1921 b
J. E. B. Seely: 1910 b, 1923
Sir Harry Foster: January 1910, 1924
Henry Duke: January 1910, 1911
Winston Churchill: 1908 b, 1924
Frederick Leverton Harris: 1907 b, 1914 b
Thomas Bramsdon: 1906, 1918
Havelock Wilson: 1906, 1918
John Scurrah Randles: 1906 b, 1912 b
Bonar Law: 1906 b, 1911 b
James Rowlands: 1906, December 1910
Harry Levy-Lawson: 1905 b, 1910
Walter Runciman: 1902 b, 1924
Charles Cripps: 1901 b, 1910
Alfred Billson: 1897 b, 1906
Sir Francis Evans: 1896 b, 1901 b
Lord Henry Cavendish-Bentinck: 1895, 1910
Sir Robert Finlay: 1895, January 1910
Robert Hermon-Hodge: 1895, 1909 b, 1917 b
Archibald Grove: 1895, 1906
John Fletcher Moulton: 1894 b, 1898 b
Harry Levy-Lawson: 1893 b, 1905 b, Jan 1910
Philip Stanhope: 1893 b, 1904b
Eugene Wason: 1892, 1899 b
Michael Davitt: 1892, 1893 b, 1895
William Mather: 1889 b, 1900 b
Edmund Leamy: 1888 b, 1900
Thomas Buchanan: 1888 b, 1892 b, 1903 b
Tim Healy: 1887 b, 1911 b
William O'Brien: 1887 b, 1900, January 1910
William Sproston Caine: 1886 b, 1892, 1900
James Agg-Gardner: 1885, 1900, 1911 b
Lord Charles Beresford: 1885, 1898, 1902 b, 1910
William Grenfell: 1885, 1892 b, 1900
Sir Henry Havelock-Allan, 1885, 1892
Sir William Ingram: 1885, 1892
Henry Meysey-Thompson: 1885, 1892
James Lowther: 1881 b, 1888 b
John Aloysius Blake: 1880, 1886 b
Sir Thomas Lea: 1880, 1886
Samuel Danks Waddy: 1879 b, 1882 b, 1886
Jacob Bright:1876 b, 1886
John Philip Nolan: 1874 b, 1900
Sir George Elliot: 1874 b, 1881 b, 1886
Arthur Hayter: 1873 b, 1893 b, 1900
Sir Julian Goldsmid: 1870 b, 1885
Thomas Salt: 1869 b, 1881 b, 1886
Lord Claud Hamilton: 1869 b, 1880 b, January 1910
Sir Wilfrid Lawson: 1868, 1886, 1903 b
Edward Brydges Williams: 1868, 1880
Ralph Bernal Osborne: 1866, 1870
William Henry Leatham: 1865, 1880
Arthur Otway: 1865, 1878 b
Edward Watkin: 1864, 1874
Sir John Ramsden: 1859 b, 1868, 1880
Sir James Fergusson: 1859, 1885
Abel Smith: 1859, 1866 b
Joseph Hardcastle: 1857, 1880
Sir John Salusbury-Trelawny: 1857, 1868
Sir William Fraser: 1857, 1863 b, 1874 b
George Peacocke: 1854 b, 1859, 1874
Lord Montagu Graham: 1852, 1858 b
James Patrick Mahon: 1847, 1879 b, 1887 b
William Ewart Gladstone: 1847, 1865 b
Sir Harry Verney: 1847, 1857, 1880
Viscount Melgund: 1847, 1857
Thomas Alcock: 1839, 1847
Fitzroy Kelly: 1838 b, 1843 b, 1852
Frederick Tollemache: 1837, 1857, 1868
Robert Aglionby Slaney: 1837, 1847, 1857
Anthony Lefroy: 1833, 1842, 1858
Daniel O'Connell: 1832, 1837
James Barlow-Hoy: 1832, 1835
William Lascelles: 1831, 1837, 1842 b
Sir William Miles: 1830, 1834 b
Philip John Miles: 1829 b, 1835
Sir John Beckett: 1826, 1835
John Nicholas Fazakerley: 1826, 1830 b
John Ashley Warre: 1820, 1831, 1857
Lord John Russell: 1818, 1826 b, 1835 b
William Vesey-FitzGerald: 1813 b, 1829 b, 1830 b, 1831
Frederick Trench: 1812 b, 1819 b, 1835
Lord Palmerston: 1811 b, 1831 b, 1835 b
Thomas Creevey: 1807, 1820, 1831
Sir Manasseh Masseh Lopes: 1807, 1812, 1820

Notes:
b indicates a by-election

Longest delay before making a comeback
In absolute terms two 17th-century members of the English Parliament had 35-year intervals outside the House of Commons:

Edward Mainwaring, 35 years and 269 days from serving as MP for Newcastle-under-Lyme in the parliament that closed on 12 August 1625, to returning for the same seat at start of the Cavalier Parliament on 8 May 1661,
Sir William Killigrew who was out of the Commons 35 years and 30 days from the close of the 1628 parliament on 10 March 1629 when he served as MP for Penryn, Cornwall, until returning as MP for Richmond, Yorkshire on 9 April 1664

Note that intervals of more than a decade between service in the Commons were more commonplace in the 17th than in later centuries due to factors such as:
-years when no parliaments were held, such as Charles I's rule without parliament covering 1630–39,
-Royalist MPs expelled during the English Civil Wars sitting again after the restoration of Charles II (1660),
-the Cavalier Parliament of 1661–79 which met without general elections in meantime.
-former Civil War and Commonwealth era Roundhead MPs returning to the Commons in the 1670s and 1680s under the Whig Party.

Since the establishment of regular parliamentary government at the end of the 17th century and the creation of the United Kingdom Parliament in 1801, possibly the longest gap between sitting was faced by Henry Drummond (1786–1860), of nearly 35 years between the dissolution of his first parliament on 29 September 1812 and returning to his next at the general election held in July–August 1847.

Others:

John Angerstein, 33 years (1802–1835)
Sir George Sondes, 32 years (1629–1661)
Richard Spencer, 32 years (1629–1661)
Sir William Ayscough, 32 years (1648–1681)
Walter Hungerford, 32 years (1701–1734)
Henry Bulwer, 31 years (1837–1868)
William Allen, 31 years (1900–1931)
Richard Winwood, 30 years (1648–1679)
Sir William Whitelock, 30 years (1659–1689)
Sir Thomas Hanmer, 29 years (1640–1669)
Sir John Gell, 29 years (1659–1689)
Richard Beke, 29 years (1659–1689)
Charles Boscawen, 29 years (1659–1689)
Sir Jonathan Jennings, 29 years (1659–1689)
John Manley, 29 years (1659–1689)
John Buller, 29 years (1796–1826)
Edward Herle, 28 years (second comeback) (1660–1689)
Thomas Lascelles, 28 years (1660–1689)
Sir Thomas Miller, 28 years (1778–1806)
Sir William Scott, 28 years (1830–1859)
William John Evelyn, 28 years (1857–1885)
Sir Alfred Hopkinson, 28 years (1898–1926)
Robert Hyde, 27 years (1586–1614)
Samuel Trehawke Kekewich, 27 years (1830–1858)
Sir Edward East, 26 years (1796–1833)
Love Parry-Jones, 26 years (1808-1835)
Lord Edward Thynne, 26 years (1832–1859)
Sir Sidney Montagu, 26 years (1614–1640)
Octavius Coope, 26 years (1848–1874)
James Patrick Mahon, 26 years (second comeback) (1852–1879)
Robert Ferguson, 24 years (1807–1831)
Richard Spooner, 24 years (1820–1844)
Charles Tottenham (1807–1886), 24 years (1831–1856)
Philip Pleydell-Bouverie, 24 years (1832–1857)
Sir William Morton, 23 years (1640–1663)
Vincent Denne, 23 years (1658–1681)
Henry Luttrell, 2nd Earl of Carhampton, 23 years (1794–1817)
William Peachy, 23 years (1802–1826)
Henry Tufton, 23 years (1802–1826)
William Ormsby-Gore, 23 years (1807–1830)
Edward Southwell Ruthven, 23 years (1807–1830)
John Arthur Wynne, 23 years (1832–1856)
John Ashley Warre, 23 years (1834–1857)
Sir Abel Barker, 22 years (1656–1679)
Sir John Chetwode, 22 years (1818–1841)
James Wentworth Buller, 22 years (1834–1857)
Sir Charles Berkeley, 21 years (1640–1661)
Sir William Fleetwood, 21 years (1640–1661)
Sir Richard Lloyd, 21 years (1640–1661)
Sir Robert Long, 21 years (1640–1661)
Sir Philip Mainwaring, 21 years (1640–1661)
Sir James Thynne, 21 years (1643–1664)
Robert Carden, 21 years (1859–1880)
Lord Claud Hamilton, 21 years (1888–1910)
Thomas Gewen, 20 years (1626–1647)
Sir Francis Wyndham, 20 years (1640–1660)
Sir Nicholas Crispe, 20 years (1641–1661)
William Sandys, 20 years (1641–1661)
Edmund Wyndham, 20 years (1641–1661)
Samuel Ashe, 20 years (1659–1679)
Sir Cecil Bishopp, 20 years (1734–1755)
Francis Leigh, 20 years (1801–1821)
John Cressett-Pelham, 20 years (1802–1822)
Walter Boyd, 20 years (1802–1823)
Duncombe Pleydell-Bouverie, 20 years (1807–1828)
Lord William Cholmondeley, 20 years (1832–1852)
Sir John Shelley, 20 years (1832–1852)
Mathew Wilson, 20 years (1853–1874)
Sackville Stopford-Sackville, 20 years (1880–1900)
Moss Turner-Samuels, 20 years (1924–1945)
Sir Francis Darcy, 19 years (1601–1621)
Sir Fulke Greville, 19 years (1601–1621)
Sir Henry Herbert, 19 years (1642–1661)
John Frederick Cheetham, 19 years (1885–1905)
Felix Cobbold, 19 years (1886–1906)
Ernest Bennett, 19 years (1910–1929)
Edward Herle, 18 years (first comeback) (1640–1659)
Sir John Stawell, 18 years (1642–1661)
Sir John Banks, 18 years (1659–1678)
Robert Beake, 18 years (1660–1679)
Sir Thomas Acland, 18 years (1868–1885)
Edward Brocklehurst Fielden, 18 years (1906–1924)
Fenner Brockway, 18 years (1931–1950)
Thomas Onley, 17 years (1554–1572)
Sir Thomas Littleton, 17 years (1644–1661)
Jonathan Rashleigh, 17 years (1644–1661)
Sir Ralph Assheton, 17 years (1662–1679)
Richard Watson, 17 years (1835–1852)
Sir James Fergusson, 17 years (1868–1885)
John Henry Maden, 17 years (1900–1917)
Paul Tyler, 17 years (1974–1992)
James Patrick Mahon, 16 years (first comeback) (1830–1847)
Hugh Lucas-Tooth, 16 years (1929–1945)
Ian Horobin, 16 years (1935–1951)

The longest interval between parliamentary service for women MPs was 13 years in the case of Jennie Lee, Leah Manning and Lucy Noel-Buxton, Baroness Noel-Buxton who lost their first seats at the general election of October 1931 then gained their second at that of July 1945.

MPs who resigned without completing at least one full parliament (or five years service)
Imran Ahmad Khan, 2022 (resigned after conviction for sexual assault)
Barry McElduff, 2018 (published a video which was seen to be a mockery of the Kingsmill massacre)
Mark Reckless, 2014 (resigned to re-contest, after defecting to UKIP)
Louise Mensch, 2012 (resigned to spend more time with her family)
Jim Nicholson, 1985 (resigned to re-contest but was defeated)
Frank Cousins, 1966 (disagreed with Prime Minister over introducing a statutory incomes policy)
Malcolm St. Clair, 1963 (honoured a pledge to stand down)
Sidney Schofield, 1953
John Belcher, 1949 (scandal)
Tom Williamson, 1948
Noel Mason-Macfarlane, 1946 (ill health)
John Boyd Orr, 1946 (resigned to become Director-General of the Food and Agriculture Organization)
Clarice Shaw, 1946 (terminally ill)

MPs who represented multiple parties

It is relatively common for MPs to cross the floor and join another party, sometimes with a period as an independent. MPs representing three distinct parties in the House of Commons are much less common.

 Richard Acland – Liberals (1935 to 1942), Common Wealth Party (1942 to 1945), Labour (1947 to 1955)
 Heidi Allen – Conservatives (2015 to February 2019), Change UK (February to June 2019), Liberal Democrats (October to December 2019)Ind
 Carlyon Bellairs – Liberals (1906), Liberal Unionists (1906 to 1910), Conservatives (1915 to 1931)
 Luciana Berger – Labour (2010 to February 2019), Change UK (February to June 2019), Liberal Democrats (September to December 2019)Ind
 John Cartwright – Labour (1974 to 1981), Social Democrats (1981 to 1988), continuing Social Democrats (1988 to 1990)SDP
 Jesse Collings – Liberals (1885 to 1886), Liberal Unionists (1886 to 1912), Conservatives (1912 to 1918)
 Robert Finlay – Liberals (1885 to 1886), Liberal Unionists (1886 to 1892, 1895 to 1906, 1910 to 1912), Scottish Unionists (1912 to 1916)
 John Horam – Labour (1970 to 1981), Social Democrats (1981 to 1983), Conservatives (1992 to 2010)
 Frank Markham – Labour (1929 to 1931), National Labour (1931; 1935 to 1945), Conservatives (1951 to 1964)
 Francis Mildmay – Liberals (1885 to 1886), Liberal Unionists (1886 to 1912), Conservatives (1912 to 1922)
 Oswald Mosley – Conservatives (1918 to 1920), Labour (1924 to 1931), New Party (1931)
 Angela Smith – Labour (2005 to February 2019), Change UK (February to June 2019), Liberal Democrats (September to December 2019)Ind
 David Owen – Labour (1977 to 1981), Social Democrats (1981 to 1988), continuing Social Democrats (1988 to 1990)SDP
 Jim Sillars – Labour (1970 to 1976), Scottish Labour (1976 to 1979), Scottish National Party (1988 to 1992)
 Chuka Umunna – Labour (2010 to February 2019), Change UK (February to June 2019), Liberal Democrats (August to December 2019)
 Sarah Wollaston – Conservatives (2010 to February 2019), Change UK (February to June 2019), Liberal Democrats (August to December 2019)

Ind : Was also a member of The Independents, a grouping of independent MPs that was not registered as a political party

SDP : After the Social Democratic Party merged with the Liberal Party to form the Liberal Democrats, a minority of SDP members formed the continuing SDP.

Former and future Commonwealth heads of government
Several former heads of government have settled in Britain after their service and served in one of the Houses.
Australia:
Sir Robert Torrens, Premier of South Australia (September 1857); MP for Cambridge 1868–74
Sir George Reid, Prime Minister of Australia (1904–05), previously Premier of New South Wales (1894–99); MP for St George, Hanover Square 1916–18
Sir Newton Moore, Premier of Western Australia (1906–10); MP for St George, Hanover Square October–December 1918, Islington North 1918–23, and Richmond upon Thames 1924–32
Stanley Melbourne Bruce, 1st Viscount Bruce of Melbourne, Prime Minister of Australia (1923–29); in House of Lords 1947–67

Canada:
Joseph Martin, Premier of British Columbia (February–June 1900); St Pancras East 1910–18
Richard Bedford Bennett, 1st Viscount Bennett, Prime Minister of Canada (1930–35); in House of Lords 1941–47

Northern Ireland:
Several Prime Ministers of Northern Ireland when it had its own parliamentary government between 1921 and 1972 while remaining in the UK came to serve in Westminster as follows:

James Craig, 1st Viscount Craigavon, Prime Minister of Northern Ireland 1921–40, MP for East Down 1906–18 and Mid Down 1918–21; in House of Lords 1927–40.
Basil Brooke, 1st Viscount Brookeborough, Prime Minister of Northern Ireland 1943–63; in House of Lords 1952–73
Terence O'Neill, Baron O'Neill of the Maine, Prime Minister of Northern Ireland 1963–69; in House of Lords 1970–90
James Chichester-Clark, Baron Moyola, Prime Minister of Northern Ireland 1969–71; in House of Lords 1971–2002
Brian Faulkner, Baron Faulkner of Downpatrick, Prime Minister of Northern Ireland 1971–72; in House of Lords 1977

Several United Kingdom MPs have become a head of government in other parts of the Commonwealth:

Australia:
Sir Charles Gavan Duffy, Premier of Victoria (1871–72), had been MP for New Ross in Ireland in 1852–56
Sir Bryan O'Loghlen, Premier of Victoria (1881–83), had been MP for County Clare, Ireland in 1877–79 (but did not sit)

Hong Kong (as crown colony in 1843–1941 and 1945–1981; Dependent Territory in 1981–1997):
John Bowring, Governor of Hong Kong (1854–59), had been MP for Kilmarnock Burghs in 1835–37 and for Bolton in 1841–49.
John Pope Hennessy, Governor of Hong Kong (1877–83), had been MP for King's County in 1859–65.
Chris Patten, Governor of Hong Kong (1992–97), had been MP for Bath in 1979–92.

Irish Free State (within Commonwealth to 1948 – subsequently seceded as the Republic of Ireland):
W. T. Cosgrave, President of the Executive Council (1922–32), had been MP for Kilkenny City in 1917–18 and for North Kilkenny 1918–22 but he did not sit at Westminster because of the Sinn Féin policy of abstentionism.
Éamon de Valera, President of the Executive Council (1932–37) and Taoiseach (1937–48) while the Irish Free State was within the Commonwealth (later Taoiseach in the Government of Ireland in 1951–54 and 1957–59, and President of Ireland 1959–73). He had been MP for East Clare 1917–22 and for East Mayo 1918–22, but he did not sit at Westminster because of the Sinn Féin policy of abstentionism.

Malta:
Gerald Strickland, 1st Baron Strickland, Prime Minister of Malta (1927–32), had been MP for Lancaster 1924–28; also sat in the House of Lords 1928–40.

Pakistan:
Chaudhry Mohammad Sarwar, Governor of Punjab (2013–15, 2018–22), had been MP for Glasgow Govan 1997–2005 and Glasgow Central 2005–10; also sat in the Senate of Pakistan 2018.

Women

The first woman elected to the House of Commons was Constance Markievicz who was elected on 14 December 1918 to the constituency of Dublin St Patrick's, but she refused to take her seat as she was a member of Sinn Féin.

The first woman to take her seat as an MP was Conservative Nancy Astor, Viscountess Astor, elected 28 November 1919.

The first female MP to become a cabinet minister was Margaret Bondfield who was appointed Minister of Labour in 1929.

The first female Prime Minister of the United Kingdom was Margaret Thatcher who served as PM from 1979 to 1990 and Leader of the Conservative Party from 1975 to 1990. Margaret Thatcher was also the first woman to hold one of the Great Offices of State.

Mother-daughter sets of MPs
These are rarer than father-son sets:

 Edith Summerskill, MP for Fulham West 1938–55 and Warrington 1955–61, was mother of Shirley Summerskill, MP for Halifax 1964–83. Their consecutive service in the Commons totalled 43 years and spans 45 years.
 Winnie Ewing, MP for Hamilton 1967–70 and Moray and Nairn 1974–79 was mother of Annabelle Ewing, MP for Perth 2001–05.

Sister sets
Sylvia Heal (née Sylvia Lloyd Fox), MP for Mid Staffordshire 1990–92 and Halesowen and Rowley Regis 1997–2010 and Ann Keen (née Ann Lloyd Fox), MP for Brentford and Isleworth 1997–2010. Keen additionally served with her husband, Alan Keen.

There are two sets of sisters since the 2019 general election: 
 Angela Eagle, MP for Wallasey since 1992, and Maria Eagle, MP for Liverpool Garston 1997–2010 and Garston and Halewood since 2010.
 Rachel Reeves, MP for Leeds West since 2010, and Ellie Reeves, MP for Lewisham West and Penge since 2017. Ellie Reeves additionally serves with her husband, John Cryer.

The first sister set to succeed each other, indirectly, to the same constituency have been Jo Cox and Kim Leadbeater who both represented Batley and Spen respectively in 2015-16 and since by-election in 2021.

Constituency representation
Most women representing:

Halifax (in 1964–83 and since 1987) and Erewash (continuously since 1992) have both – since 2015 – been represented by a fourth woman to sit for their constituencies, as has Birmingham Edgbaston since 2017 and Batley and Spen since 2021.

Longest period represented by women MPs:

Birmingham Edgbaston has been represented by 4 women MPs in continuous succession since a by-election on 2 July 1953, a period of 69 years, apart from a vacancy interval of 63 days between the death of Dame Edith Pitt on 27 January 1966 and the election of her successor Dame Jill Knight at the general election that year.

Husband-wife sets of MPs

First couples to serve as MPs

 Indirectly successively – John Stewart-Murray, Marquess of Tullibardine was MP for West Perthshire from the December 1910 general election until 1917 when he succeeded his father as Duke of Atholl and moved to the House of Lords. His wife Katharine Stewart-Murray, Duchess of Atholl, was MP for Kinross and West Perthshire from 1923 to 1938.
 Directly successively – Waldorf Astor (later 2nd Viscount Astor), who was MP for Plymouth December 1910 – December 1918 and Plymouth Sutton December 1918 – October 1919 (on succession to hereditary peerage), and Nancy Astor, Viscountess Astor, who succeeded him as MP for the latter seat, becoming the first woman to take her seat in the Commons, from by-election in November 1919 until July 1945.
 Concurrently – Walter Runciman, MP for Swansea West 1924–1929 and Hilda Runciman, MP for St Ives 1928–1929. She relinquished the latter seat at the 1929 general election, enabling him to hold the seat until 1937. (He was also, previously, MP for Oldham 1899–1900 and Dewsbury 1902–1918.)

First widow elected to succeed deceased husband as MP

Margaret Wintringham who became MP for Louth, Lincolnshire in 1921 at by-election following death of her husband Thomas Wintringham, who had only served since June 1920 and had died in August 1921. She lost the seat at the 1924 general election. She was the second woman to take her seat in the Commons.

Longest concurrent Commons service as married couple

Nicholas Winterton and Ann Winterton – 27 years, from the latter's election in 1983 for Congleton until both retired at the 2010 general election. The former had commenced serving as MP for Macclesfield from 1971. They are also contenders for the record of couple with highest collective years of service in the Commons, totaling 66 years.

Longest span of couple's service in the Commons

 (Consecutive) – Noel Buxton, MP for Whitby from by-election in May 1905 to 1906, and for Norfolk North 1910 to 1918 and 1922 to 1930 when he was raised to peerage as Baron Noel-Buxton, following which his wife Lucy, Baroness Noel-Buxton served as MP for Norfolk North from 1930 to the 1931 general election, and for Norwich from 1945 to 1950, making a span of nearly 45 years.
 (Concurrent) – Aneurin Bevan was MP for Ebbw Vale from 1929 (until his death in 1960), while his wife Jennie Lee, served from 1945 to 1970 as MP for Cannock, making a span of 41 years and 18 days. The latter had been MP for North Lanarkshire from 1929 to 1931, prior to their marriage in 1934.

Representation of a constituency by a couple

The establishment of single-member seats by the 20th century as the norm for parliamentary constituencies means there have been no concurrent representations of a constituency by a couple but successive representations by one spouse after the other has died or relinquished the seat have been relatively commonplace in parliament.

Hemel Hempstead was represented the longest, for nearly 39 years, by John Davidson from a by-election in November 1920 until he was elevated to the House of Lords as Viscount Davidson in 1937, when the seat was represented by his wife Frances Davidson, Viscountess Davidson from the subsequent by-election until her retirement at the October 1959 general election.

Louth, Lincolnshire was represented for the shortest time, a total of 4 years and 3 months, by Thomas Wintringham from June 1920 to his death in August 1921, then by his widow, Margaret, from the by-election in September 1921 to the general election in October 1924.

Couples who served separately as MPs before marriage but not together after

 Campbell Stephen, MP for Glasgow Camlachie 1922–1931 and 1935 to his death in 1947, who married in 1945 Dorothy Jewson, who had been MP for Norwich in 1923–1924.
 Nigel Fisher, MP for Hitchin 1950–1955 and Surbiton 1955–1983, who married in 1956 Patricia Ford who had been MP for North Down 1953–1955.
 Jim Sillars, MP for South Ayrshire 1970–1979 and Glasgow Govan 1988–1992, who married in 1981 Margo MacDonald who had been MP for Glasgow Govan in 1973–1974
 Sir Alan Beith, MP for Berwick-upon-Tweed 1973–2015, who married in 2001 Diana Maddock, who had been MP for Christchurch 1993–1997.

Couples who married serving as MPs

 Andrew MacKay, MP for Birmingham Stechford 1977–1979, East Berkshire 1983–1997 and Bracknell 1997–2010, who married in August 1997, Julie Kirkbride, MP for Bromsgrove 1997–2010, when both had been returned in the general election in May 1997.
 Frank Doran, MP for Aberdeen South 1987–1992, Aberdeen Central 1997–2005, and Aberdeen North 2005–2015, who married in 2010 Dame Joan Ruddock, MP for Lewisham Deptford 1987–2015.
 Duncan Hames, MP for Chippenham 2010–2015, who married in 2011 Jo Swinson, MP for East Dunbartonshire 2005–2015 and 2017–2019.
 Nick Raynsford, MP for Fulham 1983–1987, Greenwich 1992–1997 and Greenwich & Woolwich 1997–2015, who married in 2012 Alison Seabeck, MP for Plymouth Devonport 2005–2010 and Plymouth Moor View 2010–2015.
 Nick Smith, MP for Blaenau Gwent since 2010 who married in 2012 Jenny Chapman was MP for Darlington 2010–2019.
 Mark Lancaster, MP for North East Milton Keynes 2005–2010 and Milton Keynes North 2010–2019, who married in 2014 Caroline Dinenage, MP for Gosport since 2010.
 Jack Lopresti, MP for Filton and Bradley Stoke since 2010, who married in 2017 Andrea Jenkyns, MP for Morley and Outwood since 2015.
Philip Davies, MP for Shipley since 2005, who married in 2020 Esther McVey, MP for Wirral West 2010-2015 and for Tatton since 2017

Couples who divorced before one partner became an MP

 Shirley Summerskill, MP for Halifax 1964–1983, who divorced in 1971 from her husband John Ryman, who later became MP for Blyth 1974–1983, and Blyth Valley 1983–1987.
 Ron Davies, MP for Caerphilly 1983–2001, who divorced in 1999 from his wife Christina Rees, who later became MP for Neath since 2015.

Couple who divorced when one partner had ceased to be an MP

John Dunwoody, MP for Falmouth and Camborne 1966–1970, and Gwyneth Dunwoody, MP for Exeter 1966–1970 and Crewe 1974–1983 and Crewe and Nantwich 1983–2008, who divorced in 1975.

Couple who divorced while serving as MPs

Gordon Prentice, MP for Pendle 1992–2010 and Bridget Prentice, MP for Lewisham East 1992–2010, who divorced in 2000. They were married to each other when both were returned at the same 1992 general election.

Currently serving MP couples

 John Cryer, MP for Hornchurch 1997–2005 and Leyton and Wanstead since 2010, married since 2012 to Ellie Reeves, MP for Lewisham West and Penge since 2017.
 Jack Lopresti, MP for Filton and Bradley Stoke since 2010, married since 2017 to Andrea Jenkyns, MP for Morley and Outwood since 2015.
Philip Davies, MP for Shipley since 2005, married since 2020 to Esther McVey, MP for Wirral West 2010-2015 and for Tatton since 2017.

Couples with one spouse still serving in the Commons

 Sir Peter Bottomley, MP for Woolwich West 1975–1983, Eltham 1983–1997, and Worthing West since 1997, whose wife Virginia (now Baroness Bottomley) was MP for South West Surrey 1984–2005
 Yvette Cooper, MP for Pontefract and Castleford 1997–2010, and for Normanton, Pontefract and Castleford since 2010, whose husband Ed Balls was MP for Normanton 2005–2010 and Morley and Outwood 2010–2015
 Caroline Dinenage, MP for Gosport since 2010, whose husband Mark Lancaster was MP for North East Milton Keynes 2005–2010 and Milton Keynes North 2010–2019
 Natalie Elphicke, MP for Dover since 2019, whose husband and predecessor Charlie was MP for the same constituency 2010–2019
 Kate Griffiths, MP for Burton since 2019, whose husband and predecessor Andrew was MP for the same constituency 2010–2019
 Nick Smith, MP for Blaenau Gwent since 2010, whose wife Jenny Chapman was MP for Darlington 2010–2019

First UK MP married to a foreign head of government

Stephen Kinnock, MP for Aberavon since May 2015, is married to Helle Thorning-Schmidt, member of the Danish Parliament 2005–2016 and Prime Minister of Denmark 2011–2015, resigning shortly after Kinnock's election.

Mother-in-law and child-in-law sets
(Not as commonplace as those of fathers- and children-in-law.)

 Gwendolen Guinness, Countess of Iveagh, MP for Southend 1927–1935, was mother-in-law to two sons-in-law serving as MPs in her lifetime:
Sir Henry Channon, MP for Southend 1935–1950 and Southend West 1950–1958
Alan Lennox-Boyd, MP for Mid Bedfordshire 1931–1960

 Edith Summerskill, MP for Fulham West 1938–1955 and Warrington 1955–1961, was mother-in-law (prior to his divorce from her daughter Shirley) to John Ryman, MP for Blyth 1974–1983 and Blyth Valley 1983–1987
 Patricia Ford, MP for North Down 1953–1955, was mother-in-law to Sir Michael Grylls, MP for Chertsey 1970–1974 and North West Surrey 1974–1997
 Winnie Ewing, MP for Hamilton 1967–1970 and Moray and Nairn 1974–1979, was mother-in-law to Margaret Ewing, MP for East Dunbartonshire 1974–1979 and Moray 1987–2001
 Ann Cryer, MP for Keighley 1997–2010, is mother-in-law to Ellie Reeves, MP for Lewisham West and Penge since 2017, who is the wife of her son John Cryer, also a serving MP.

Parents and children sets – unusual records

Children elected before parents
This is not as commonplace as children following parents into the Commons.
 Thomas Davis Lamb, elected in 1802, and father Thomas Phillipps Lamb, elected in 1812.
 Robert Williams (1767–1847), elected in 1802, and father Robert Williams (1735–1814), elected in 1807.
 William Miles, elected in 1818, and father Philip John Miles, elected in 1820.
 Raymond Greene, elected in 1895, and father Sir Edward Greene, Bt, elected in 1900.
 Walter Runciman, elected in 1899, and father Sir Walter Runciman, Bt, elected in 1914.

Children serving alongside parents
It is rarer for parents and children to serve in the Commons simultaneously than consecutively (frequent cause of latter being death, retirement or promotion to House of Lords of the father). In most cases given below the children entered parliament in latter stages of the parent's service.
 Ann Cryer, MP 1997–2010, and son John Cryer, MP 1997–2005 and since 2010.
 Sally Oppenheim-Barnes, MP 1970–87, and son Phillip Oppenheim, MP 1983-97 - first mother and son set to serve concurrently.
 David Mitchell, MP between 1964 and 1997, and son Andrew Mitchell, MP 1987–97 and since 2001.
 Tony Benn, MP 1950–2001, and son Hilary Benn, MP since 1999.
 Thomas Galbraith, MP between 1940 and 65, and son Tam, MP 1948–82.
 Harold Macmillan, MP 1924–64, and son Maurice Macmillan, MP 1955–84.
 Arthur Greenwood, MP 1922–54, and son Tony Greenwood, MP 1946–70.
 Isaac Foot, MP 1922–35, and son Dingle, MP 1931–70.
 William Adamson, MP 1910–31, and son William Murdoch Adamson, MP 1922–45.
 Stanley Baldwin, MP 1908–37, and son Oliver, MP 1929–47.
 Sir Francis Acland, MP 1906–39, and son Richard, MP 1935–55.
 Ramsay MacDonald, MP 1906–37 and son Malcolm MacDonald, MP 1929–45.
 Arthur Henderson, MP 1903–35, and sons Arthur, junior, MP 1923–66 and William, MP 1923–31.
 Winston Churchill, MP 1900–64, and son Randolph, MP 1940–45.
 Sir Edward Greene, 1st Baronet, MP 1900–06, and son Sir Raymond Greene, 2nd Baronet, MP 1895–1923.
 John Fitazalan Hope, MP 1900–29, and son Arthur, MP 1924–39.
 Sir Walter Runciman, MP 1914–18, and son Walter, MP 1899–1937.
 Alexander Henderson, MP 1898–1916, and son Harold Henderson, MP 1910–16.
 Wentworth Beaumont, MP 1895–1907, and brother Hubert, MP 1906–10.
 Sir Frederick Cawley, MP 1895–1918, and son Harold Thomas Cawley, MP 1910–15.
 Alfred Hopkinson, MP 1895–98 and 1926–29, and son Austin Hopkinson, MP 1918–29 and 1931–45.
 John Benn, MP 1892–1910, and son William Wedgwood Benn, MP 1906–42. (Latter father of Tony Benn.)
 Thomas Curran, MP 1892–1900, and son Thomas Bartholomew Curran MP 1892–1900.
 David Lloyd George, MP 1890–1945, son Gwilym Lloyd George, MP 1922–57, and daughter Megan Lloyd George, MP 1929–51 and 1957–66. First concurrent father and son and daughter set of MPs when returned at 1929 general election.
 Sir Charles Swann, 1st Baronet, MP 1886–1918, and son Duncan Swann, MP 1906–10.
 Sir John Brunner, 1st Baronet, MP 1885–1910, and son Sir John Brunner, 2nd Baronet, MP 1906–24.
 John Redmond, MP 1881–1918, and son William Redmond, MP 1910–22.
 Justin McCarthy (1830–1912), MP 1879–1900, and son Justin Huntly McCarthy, MP 1884–92.
 Joseph Chamberlain, MP 1876–1914, and son Austen, MP 1892–1937.
 William Vernon Harcourt, MP 1868–1904, and son Lewis, MP 1904–17 (the latter was elected in March 1904, before his father died serving in October same year).
 Samuel Morley, MP 1866–85, and son Arnold, MP 1880–95.
 Sir Joseph Whitwell Pease, 1st Baronet, MP 1865–1903, and sons Sir Alfred Edward Pease, 2nd Baronet, MP 1885–1902, and Joseph Albert Pease, MP 1892–1916.
 George Goschen, MP 1863–1900, and his son George Goschen, jnr, MP 1895–1900.
 Sir Bernhard Samuelson, MP 1859–95, and son Henry, MP 1868–85.
 John Hubbard, MP 1859–87, and son Egerton, MP 1874–89.
 Sir Edward Watkin, MP 1857–95 and son Alfred Mellor Watkin, MP 1877–80.
 Abel Smith (1829–1898), MP 1854–98, and son Abel Henry Smith, MP 1892–1910.
 William Philip Price, MP 1852–73, and son William Edwin Price, MP 1868–80.
 Samuel Whitbread, MP 1852–95, and son Samuel Howard Whitbread, MP 1892–1910.
 Michael Thomas Bass, MP 1848–83, and sons Michael, MP 1865–86, and Hamar Alfred Bass, MP 1878–98.
 Lionel de Rothschild, MP 1847–74, and his son Nathan Rothschild, MP 1865–85.
 John Bright, MP 1843–89, and son William, MP 1885–90.
 Walter Long, MP 1835–65 and son Richard Penruddocke Long, MP 1859–68.
 Sir Thomas Dyke Acland, 11th Baronet, MP 1837–86, and sons Thomas, MP 1882–92, and Arthur, MP 1885–99.
 John Bagshaw, MP 1835–59, and son Robert John Bagshaw, MP 1857–59 (both represented same two-member seat of Harwich).
 William Ewart Gladstone, MP 1832–95, and sons William Henry, MP 1865–85, and Herbert, MP 1880–1910.
Thomas Law Hodges, MP 1830–41 and 1847–52, and son Thomas Twisden Hodges, MP 1835–37 and 1847–52.
 Thomas Langlois Lefroy, MP 1830–41, and son Anthony, MP 1830–70.
 Daniel O'Connell, MP 1828–46, and sons John, MP 1832–57, Maurice, MP 1832–53, and Morgan, MP 1832–40. (Possibly greatest number of sons returned alongside their father in 1832 general election.)
 Sir Gilbert Heathcote, 5th Baronet, MP 1820–56, and son Sir Gilbert Heathcote, 6th Baronet, MP 1852–67.
 Philip John Miles, MP 1820–37, and son William Miles, MP 1818–65.
 Hussey Vivian, MP 1820–41, and son Charles Vivian, MP 1835–42.
 Ralph Bernal, MP 1818–52, and son Ralph Bernal Osborne, MP 1841–74.
 Luke White, MP 1818–24, and son Henry White, MP 1823–61.
 George Tennyson, MP 1818–19, and son Charles Tennyson d'Eyncourt, MP 1818–52.
 John Maberley, MP 1816–32, and son William Leader Maberley, MP 1819–34.
 Wilbraham Egerton, MP 1812–31, and son William Egerton, MP 1830–58.
 Henry Lowther, MP 1812–67, and son Henry, jnr, MP 1847–72.
 Sir Thomas Frankland Lewis, MP 1812–55, and son George Cornewall Lewis, MP 1847–63.
 Sir George Philips, 1st Baronet, MP 1812–35, and son Sir George Philips, 2nd Baronet, MP 1818–52.
 Sir Robert Peel, 2nd Baronet, MP 1809–50, and son Frederick Peel, MP 1849–65.
 Richard Hart Davis, MP 1807–31, and his son Hart Davis, MP 1812–18.
 Alexander Baring, MP 1806–35, and sons Bingham Baring, MP 1826–48, and Francis Baring, MP 1830–57.
 William Ormsby-Gore, MP 1806–57, and son John, MP 1837–76.
 Sir John Shelley, MP 1806–31, and son John Villiers Shelley, MP 1830–67.
 Henry Grattan, MP 1803–20, and son James, MP 1817–29.
 Robert Haldane Bradshaw, MP 1802–32, and son James, MP 1825–32. (They represented the same, two-member seat, of Brackley.)
 Charles Chaplin the elder, MP 1802–16, and son Charles Chaplin the younger, MP 1809–31
 John Smith, MP 1802–35, and son John Abel Smith, MP 1830–59.
 Charles Grant, MP 1802–18, and son Charles, jnr, MP 1811–35.
 Sir Robert Wigram, 1st Baronet, MP 1802–07, and son Sir Robert Wigram, 2nd Baronet, MP 1806–30.
 Robert Williams (1735–1814), MP 1807–12, and his son Robert Williams (1767–1847), MP 1802–34.
 Henry Bankes, MP 1801–31, and sons William John Bankes, MP 1810–34, and George Bankes, MP 1816–56.
 John Blackburne (1754–1833), MP 1801–31, and son John Ireland Blackburne (1783–1874), MP 1807–47.
 John Calcraft, MP 1801–31, and son John Hales Calcraft, MP 1820–59.
 John Calvert (1726–1804), MP 1801–02, and son John Calvert (died 1844), MP 1801–31.
 Lord George Cavendish, MP 1801–31, and sons William Cavendish, MP 1804–12, George Henry Compton Cavendish, MP 1806–09, Henry Frederick Compton Cavendish, MP 1812–34, and Charles Compton Cavendish, MP 1814–57. (Largest number of sons serving during their father's service in the Commons.)
 Sir Henry Dashwood, 3rd Baronet, MP 1801–20, and son George Dashwood, MP 1814–18.
 Sir William Lemon, 1st Baronet, MP 1801–24, and son Sir Charles Lemon, 2nd Baronet, MP 1807–57.
 John Fownes Luttrell (1752–1816), MP 1801–16, and son John Fownes Luttrell (1787–1857), MP 1812–32. (Both sat together for same two-member seat, Minehead.)
 Andrew Foley, MP 1801–18, and son Thomas, MP 1805–22.
 Sir Gilbert Heathcote, 4th Baronet, MP 1801–41, and son Sir Gilbert Heathcote, 5th Baronet, MP 1820–56.
 Michael Hicks-Beach (1760–1830), MP 1801–18, and son William Hicks-Beach (1783–1856), MP 1812–17.
 Sir Robert Peel, 1st Baronet, MP 1801–20, and sons Sir Robert Peel, 2nd Baronet, MP 1809–50, and William Yates Peel, MP 1817–47.
 Samuel Smith (1754–1834), MP 1801–32, and son Abel Smith (1788–1859), MP 1810–47. (On two occasions they sat together for the same two-member seat, Wendover, in 1812–18 and 1830–32.)
 Sir Matthew White Ridley, MP 1801–12, and son Nicholas Ridley-Colborne, MP 1805–37.
 Thomas Drake Tyrwhitt-Drake, MP 1801–10, and son Thomas Tyrwhitt-Drake, MP 1805–32. (Both sat for same two-member seat, Amersham.)
 John Beresford, MP 1801–05, and son John Claudius Beresford, MP 1801–11.
 Sir Mark Wood, 1st Baronet, MP 1801–18, and son Mark Wood, jnr., MP 1816–18. (They sat together for same two-member seat, Gatton.)

Brother sets of MPs

Largest set

Six brother sets:

 Francis Seymour-Conway, Viscount Beauchamp (later 2nd Marquess of Hertford) served 1766–1794; Lord George Seymour-Conway 1784–1790 and 1796–1801; Henry-Seymour-Conway (later Lord Henry Seymour) 1766–1784; Lord Robert Seymour 1771–1790 and 1794–1820; Lord William Seymour 1783–1784 and 1785–1796; and Lord Hugh Seymour 1784–1786 and 1788 to his death in 1801. All began serving in the pre-1801 Parliament of Great Britain and their service in the Commons totalled 126 years.
 Henry Paget, Lord Paget (later 1st Marquess of Anglesey) served 1790–1804 and 1806–1810; Arthur Paget 1794–1807; Berkeley Paget 1807–1826; Sir Charles Paget 1804–1826 and 1831–1833 and 1833–1834; Sir Edward Paget, 1796–1806 and 1810–1820; and William Paget 1790 to his death in 1794. Four of the brothers began serving under the pre-1801 Parliament of Great Britain and their service in the Commons totalled 79 years.

Longest span of service in the Commons by brothers
Probably the longest (though not continuous) all time span of service by brothers in the Commons, in the Parliament of England, was 85 years from 1562, when Sir Henry Knollys was elected MP for Reading, until the death in 1648 of his brother Sir Francis Knollys (above, aged reputedly 97) also representing Reading, although there were intervals of years when parliament did not meet. They were part of another set of six brothers who all sat at various times.

Since regular parliamentary government was established by the start of the UK Parliament, contenders for longest span of continuous service include the four brothers Sir Robert Peel (also twice Prime Minister), William Yates Peel, Jonathan Peel and Edmund Peel, with a span of 59 years from Robert's by-election return on 15 April 1809 as MP for Cashel, to the retirement of Jonathan at the 1868 general election as MP for Huntingdon. Their collective service totalled 115 years and all four were simultaneously in Parliament when Edmund was sitting in 1831–1832 and 1835–1837 for Newcastle-under-Lyme. Another 59-year service span was enjoyed by two brothers, William Lowther, 2nd Earl of Lonsdale (when Viscount Lowther before entering the House of Lords in 1841) and Henry Cecil Lowther, from the former's election as MP for Cockermouth in 1808 until the death of the latter as MP for Westmorland (which he had represented since 1812) and Father of the House on 4 December 1867.

Thomas Hyde Villiers and his brother Charles Pelham Villiers (above) had a span of nearly 72 years service from the former's first election as MP in 1826 to the latter's death as a serving MP and Father of the House in 1898, but this was broken by an interval when the former was out of parliament in 1831, and the gap between Thomas' death on 3 December 1832 and Charles' first election in 1835. Their consecutive service thus totalled 69 years.

Representation of same constituency by brothers
Where seats were in the patronage of territorial magnates, it was commonplace into the 19th century for brothers in (usually landowning) families to hold seats successively or (before the advent of single member seats) even concurrently, before the system of choosing candidates by local party associations became organised on a competitive selection basis.
Two brothers successively represented North Derbyshire for a total span of nearly 48 years. Lord Cavendish of Keighley was MP from the 1832 general election until succeeding his father and going to the House of Lords as Earl of Burlington in 1834. He was succeeded by Lord George Henry Cavendish from 1834 until the latter's death on 23 September 1880.

The last set of brothers to represent the same constituency were Frederick and Henry Guest, who did so in connection with two successive constituencies:
 East Dorset. Frederick was first elected at the January 1910 general election but was unable to take his seat due to irregularity by an election agent, causing a by-election in June 1910 when he stepped aside in favour of Henry, who held the seat until the December 1910 general election when Henry in turn stepped aside in favour of Frederick who was elected, to hold the seat until the 1922 general election. 
 Plymouth Drake, of which Frederick was MP from 1931 to his death in 1937 when Henry succeeded him at the by-election and held the seat until the 1945 general election.

Brother sets serving after the 2019 general election
Sets with one brother still serving:
Boris Johnson, MP for Henley 2001–08 and Uxbridge and South Ruislip from 2015, and Jo Johnson, MP for Orpington 2010–19.
David Miliband, MP for South Shields 2001–13, and Ed Miliband, MP for Doncaster North from 2005.

Brother-sister sets of MPs

 Gwilym Lloyd George (later 1st Viscount Tenby), MP for Pembrokeshire 1922–1924 and 1929–1950 and Newcastle upon Tyne North 1951–1957, and sister Lady Megan Lloyd George, MP for Anglesey 1929–1951 and Carmarthen 1957–1966.
 Victor Cazalet, MP for Chippenham 1924–1943 and his sister Thelma Cazalet-Keir, MP for Islington East 1931–1945.

Brother-sister set serving after the 2019 general election
 Set with one sibling still serving – Keith Vaz, MP for Leicester East 1987–2019, and sister Valerie Vaz, MP for Walsall South from 2010.

Twins
James Grenville and Richard Grenville sat together as MPs for Buckingham from 1774 to 1780.

Edward John Stanley, MP for North Cheshire, sat alongside his brother William Owen Stanley, MP for Anglesey, from 1837 to 1841.

Angela Eagle and Maria Eagle, mentioned above, are the only twin sisters to have sat in the Commons together, last elected in 2019.

Ethnic minorities

LGBT members

First general election victors by religious affiliation
When the UK Parliament was established in 1801, non-Anglicans were prevented from taking their seats as MPs under the Test Act 1672. However, Methodists took communion at Anglican churches until 1795, and some continued to do so, and many Presbyterians were prepared to accept Anglican communion, thus ensuring that members of these creeds were represented in the Parliament. Some Unitarians were also elected.

The first Roman Catholic general election victors in the UK Parliament were at the 1830 general election. They included Daniel O'Connell and James Patrick Mahon in Clare.

The first Quaker general election victor was Joseph Pease at the 1832 general election.

The first Moravian general election victor was Charles Hindley at the 1835 general election.

The first Jewish general election victor was Lionel de Rothschild at the 1847 general election. He was not permitted to take his seat until 1858.

The first Catholic Apostolic general election victor was Henry Drummond also at the 1847 election.

The first Baptist general election victor was George Goodman at the 1852 general election.

The first Congregationalist general election victor was Samuel Morley at the 1865 general election.

The first declared atheist general election victor was Charles Bradlaugh at the 1880 general election. He was not permitted to take the oath until January 1886, although he sat briefly in 1880–81 when permitted to affirm allegiance; a legal action later held that affirmation had no effect.

The first Parsi general election victor was Dadabhai Naoroji at the 1892 general election.

The first Sikh general election victor was Piara Khabra at the 1992 general election.

The first Latter-day Saint general election victor was Terry Rooney at the 1992 general election, after being initially elected for his seat at a by-election in 1990.

The first Muslim general election victor was Mohammad Sarwar at the 1997 general election.

The first Hindu general election victor was Shailesh Vara at the 2005 general election.

The first Buddhist general election victor was Suella Braverman, then known as Suella Fernandes, at the 2015 general election.

Physical attributes

Heaviest
The heaviest MP of all time is believed to be Sir Cyril Smith, MP for Rochdale between 1972 and 1992, who weighed 189.6 kg (nearly 30 stone) at his peak in 1976.

Tallest
Before Kawczynski's election for Shrewsbury and Atcham in 2005, the record was held by Louis Gluckstein, MP for Nottingham East between 1931 and 1945, who measured .

She served in the House of Commons as MP for Eddisbury in 2015–2019.

Shortest
Hazel Blears, MP for Salford 1997–2010 and Salford and Eccles 2010–15 was reportedly (2009) .

Physically disabled MPs
The following were all known to be disabled when serving as MPs:

Sir Francis Bryan, MP for Buckinghamshire in 1529, 1539, 1542 and 1545, who lost an eye in a tournament in 1526.

William Page, MP for Bridport in 1559, Oxford 1562–1567, and Saltash 1571–1581, who had a hand cut off in lieu of execution for distributing a political pamphlet in 1579.

John Stubbs or Stubbe, MP for Great Yarmouth 1588–1589, who also had right hand cut off in lieu of execution as Page was for publication of the same pamphlet in 1579.

Sir Thomas Hutchinson, MP for Nottinghamshire 1626 and 1640–1643, who lost two or three fingers in an attack by a guardian in 1613.

Hugh Bethell, MP for East Riding of Yorkshire 1654–1656 and Hedon 1660–1679, who lost an eye at the Battle of Marston Moor in 1644.

John Hewson, MP for Guildford 1656–1658, who lost an eye in action in Ireland in 1650.

Sir Frescheville Holles, MP for Grimsby 1667–1672, who lost an arm in a sea battle in 1666.

Thomas Erle, MP for Wareham 1679–1698 and 1701–1718, and Portsmouth 1698–1702 and 1708, who lost his right hand (by some reports) at the Battle of Almanza in 1707.

Sackville Tufton, MP for Appleby 1681–1689, who lost some use of his right hand after being wounded at the Battle of Schooneveld in 1673.

Sir James Lowther, MP for Carlisle 1694–1702, Appleby 1723–1727, and Cumberland 1708–1722 and 1727–1755, who had his right leg amputated due to gout in 1750.

John Richmond Webb, MP for Ludgershall 1695–1698, 1699–1705, 1706–1713 and 1715–1724, and for Newport, Isle of Wight 1713–1715, who was lame after being severely wounded at the Battle of Malplaquet in 1709.

John Mordaunt, Viscount Mordaunt, MP for Chippenham 1701–1705 and 1705–1708, who lost his left arm at the Battle of Blenheim in 1704.

George Clarke, MP for Winchelsea 1702–1705, East Looe 1705–1708, Launceston 1711–1713, and Oxford University 1717–1736, who by 1734 lost his left eye and was losing sight in the other.

Sir John Jennings, MP for Queenborough 1705–1710, Portsmouth 1710–1711 and Rochester 1715–1734, who was becoming increasingly deaf in 1727.

Galfridus Walpole, MP for Lostwithiel 1715–1721, who lost his right arm by a sea battle in 1711.

William Windham, MP for Sudbury 1720–1727 and Aldeburgh 1727–1730, who lost a leg at the Battle of Blenheim.

Charles Stewart, MP for Malmesbury 1723–1727 and Portsmouth 1737–1741, who lost his right hand in a sea battle in 1697.

William Banks, MP for Grampound 1741–1747, who lost use of legs after an illness in 1745.

Frederick North, Lord North, MP for Banbury 1754–1790, and Prime Minister 1770–1782, who was increasingly blind from 1786.

Isaac Barré, MP for Wycombe 1761–1774 and Calne 1774–1790, who became blind in one eye at the Battle of Quebec in 1759 and totally blind in 1784.

Richard Burton Phillipson, MP for Eye 1762–1768 and 1770–1792, who became deaf by 1784.

John Sawbridge, MP for Hythe 1768–1774 and City of London 1774–1795, who was paralysed from about 1792.

Frederick Cornewall, MP for Montgomery Boroughs 1771–1774, who lost his right arm at the Battle of Toulon (1744).

James Murray, MP for Perthshire 1773–1794, who was permanently disabled in 1761 by a battle wound that left him unable to lie down.

Hugh Palliser, MP for Scarborough 1774–1779 and Huntingdon 1780–1784, whose left leg was left permanently lame by injury from an accidental shipboard explosion in 1748.

Pinckney Wilkinson, MP for Old Sarum 1774–1784, who was incapacitated by a stroke from 1782.

Sir William Middleton, MP for Northumberland 1774–1795, who was lame for life after severe wounding at Battle of Minden in 1759.

Brook Watson, MP for the City of London 1784–1793, who lost his right leg after a shark attack while swimming at Havana in 1749.

Francis Mackenzie, MP for Ross-shire 1784–1790 and 1794–1796, who became deaf and almost dumb from scarlet fever at about age of 12.

Sir John Call, MP for Callington 1784–1801, who became blind in about 1794.

Sir Lawrence Palk, MP for Ashburton 1787–1796 and Devon 1796–1812, who was severely crippled by gout by 1809.

Banastre Tarleton, MP for Liverpool 1790–1806 and 1807–1812, who sustained a crippled right hand, losing two fingers, in action during the American War of Independence in 1781.

John Theophilus Rawdon, MP for Appleby 1791–1796, and Launceston 1796–1802, who lost a leg at the Battle of Brandywine during the American War of Independence in 1777.

Sir Watkin Williams-Wynn, MP for Beaumaris 1794–1796 and Denbighshire 1796–1840, who became deaf after contracting erysipelas in 1826, and had a large tongue which impeded speech.

Sir Alexander Hope, MP for Dumfries Burghs 1796–1800 and Linlithgowshire 1800–1834, who lost an arm and was left permanently lame after being wounded in the Flanders Campaign in 1795.

Sir Robert Abercromby, MP for Clackmannanshire 1798–1802, who became increasingly blind in office due to an eye disease contracted in India by 1797.

John Horne Tooke, MP for Old Sarum 1801–1802, who lost sight of right eye in a boyhood fight and was reportedly "lame" when he took his seat.

Robert Haldane Bradshaw, MP for Brackley 1802–1832, who lost use of his left limbs after a stroke in 1831.

Mervyn Archdall, MP for County Fermanagh 1802–1834, who lost his right arm in battle in Egypt in 1801.

James Paull, MP for Newtown (Isle of Wight) 1805–1806, who was left disabled in his right arm from a duel in 1795.

Sir William Maxwell, MP for Wigtownshire 1805–1812 and 1822–1830, who lost his left arm at the Battle of Corunna and was badly wounded in the knee in the Walcheren Expedition in 1809.

James Mingay, MP for Thetford 1806–1807, who lost his right hand in childhood accident at a mill.

Sir Samuel Hood, MP for Westminster 1806–1807 and Bridport 1807–1812, who lost an arm in action at sea in 1806.

Thomas Thompson, MP for Rochester 1807–1818, who lost a leg at the Battle of Copenhagen (1801).

Fulk Greville Howard, MP for Castle Rising 1808–1832, who lost the sight of one eye during the Helder Expedition in 1799.

Sir William Beresford, MP for County Waterford 1811–1814, who was blinded in one eye by an accident with a musket on military service in 1786.

Samuel Shepherd, MP for Dorchester 1814–1819, who was increasingly deaf since 1790.

Coningsby Waldo-Sibthorpe, MP for Lincoln 1814–1822, who was left paralysed in his lower back in carriage accident in 1821.

Lord Fitzroy Somerset, MP for Truro 1818–1820 and 1826–1829, who lost his right arm at the Battle of Waterloo.

Thomas Henry Hastings Davies, MP for Worcester 1818–1834 and 1837–1841, who became increasingly paralysed since a carriage accident while contesting the 1835 general election.

John Mytton, MP for Shrewsbury 1819–1820, who had incipient deafness which affected his only appearance in a debate.

Sir Henry Hardinge, MP for Durham 1820–1830, St Germans 1830–1831, Newport (Cornwall) 1831–1832, and Launceston 1832–1844, who lost his left hand at the Battle of Ligny in 1815.

Lord John Hay, MP for Haddingtonshire 1826–1831 and Windsor 1847–1850, who lost his left arm in a sea battle in 1807.

Lord William Lennox, MP for King's Lynn 1831–1834, who lost the sight of one eye in a horse riding accident in 1815.

William Ewart Gladstone, MP for Newark 1832–1845, Oxford University 1847–1865, South Lancashire 1865–1868, Greenwich 1868–1880, and Midlothian 1880–1895, four times Prime Minister between 1868 and 1894, who lost the forefinger of his left hand in a shotgun accident in 1842.

George Julius Poulett Scrope, MP for Stroud 1833–1867, who became increasingly blind later in office.

Admiral Sir Charles Napier, MP for Marylebone 1841–1847 and Southwark 1855–1860, who walked with a limp and stoop due to leg and neck wounds received in the Napoleonic Wars.

Henry Fawcett, MP for Brighton 1865–1874 and Hackney 1874–1884, who was blind since a field shooting accident when he was 25.

Arthur MacMurrough Kavanagh, MP for County Wexford 1866–1868 and County Carlow 1868–1880, who was born with no arms, and no legs. Or more precisely, no arms below the lower third of his upper arm, nor legs below mid thigh. And in consequence, no hands and no feet.

Joseph Chamberlain, MP for Birmingham 1876–1885 and Birmingham West 1885–1914, whose sight, speech and use of right hand were impaired by a stroke in 1906.

Walter Wren, MP for Wallingford in 1880, who was crippled by spinal disease since age of 18.

Arthur Elliot, MP for Roxburghshire 1880–1892 and City of Durham 1898–1906, who had a leg amputated at age four after a fall.

Michael Davitt, MP for Meath in 1882, North Meath in 1892, North East Cork in 1893, and South Mayo 1895–1899, who lost his right arm in an industrial accident at a textile mill in 1857 aged 11.

Sir William Tindal Robertson, MP for Brighton 1886–1889, who became blind from glaucoma in 1873.

William Archibald Macdonald, MP for Queen's County Ossory 1886–1892, who was totally blind from age of 13.

Sir William Hornby, MP for Blackburn 1886–1910, who became deaf in 1908.

George William Palmer, MP for Reading 1892–1895 and 1898–1904, who became increasingly deaf in office, causing his resignation.

Sir Winston Churchill, MP for Oldham 1900–1906, Manchester North West 1906–1908, Dundee 1908–1922, Epping 1924–1945 and Woodford 1945–1964, twice Prime Minister between 1940 and 1955, who became increasingly deaf from 1949 and a wheelchair user after a series of strokes towards the end of his service.

Joseph Nannetti, MP for Dublin College Green 1900–1915, who was paralysed by illness from 1913.

Daniel Desmond Sheehan, MP for Mid-Cork 1901–1918, who became deaf due to shellfire and ill-health while serving in World War I by 1917.

Philip Snowden, MP for Blackburn 1906–1918 and Colne Valley 1922–1931, who was paralysed by illness from waist down in 1891 and walked with aid of sticks.

Edward Frederick Lindley Wood, MP for Ripon 1910–1925, who was born with a withered left arm and without a left hand.

Duncan Frederick Campbell, MP for North Ayrshire 1911–1916, who lost his left arm at the First Battle of Ypres in 1914.

Aubrey Herbert, MP for South Somerset 1911–1918 and Yeovil 1918–1923, who was near blind from youth, becoming totally blind in his last year of life and service.

Cathal Brugha, MP for County Waterford 1918–1922, who was left with a permanent limp after being wounded in the Easter Rising 1916.

Dan Irving, MP for Burnley 1918–1924, who had lost a leg in an industrial accident as a railway worker.

Sir Oswald Mosley, MP for Harrow 1918–1924 and Smethwick 1926–1931, who was left with a permanent limp after fracturing his right leg in a plane crash during World War I.

Jack Cohen, MP for Liverpool Fairfield 1918–1931, who lost both legs at the Third Battle of Ypres.

Frederick Martin, MP for Aberdeen and Kincardine East 1922–1924, who was blinded during military training in 1915.

Douglas Pielou, MP for Stourbridge 1922–1927, who was severely disabled by wounds at the Battle of Loos in 1915.

John Jacob Astor V, MP for Dover 1922–1945, who lost his right leg in battle in World War I in 1918.

Herbert Morrison, MP for Hackney South 1923–1924, 1929–1931 and 1935–1945, Lewisham East 1945–1950 and Lewisham South 1950–1959, who lost sight of his right eye due to babyhood infection.

Mabel Philipson, MP for Berwick-upon-Tweed 1923–1929, lost sight in one eye after a car crash near Brooklands racing circuit in 1911 that killed her first husband Thomas Stanley Rhodes, nephew of Cecil Rhodes.

Ian Fraser, MP for St. Pancras North 1924–1929, 1931–1937 and for Lonsdale 1940–1958, who was blinded at the Battle of the Somme.

Robert Bourne, MP for Oxford 1924–1938, who lost sight of one eye in schooldays game of rounders and sustained a crippled hand at Suvla Bay during World War I.

Harold Macmillan, MP for Stockton-on-Tees 1924–1929 and 1931–1945 and for Bromley 1945–1964, Prime Minister 1957–1963, who was left with a slight limp and weak right hand, affecting handwriting, by a series of wounds in World War I.

Charles Simmons, MP for Birmingham Erdington 1929–1931, Birmingham West 1945–1950 and Brierley Hill 1950–1959, who lost a lower leg at the Battle of Vimy Ridge in 1917.

Richard Austen Butler, MP for Saffron Walden 1929–1965, who was left with a poorly functioning right hand after a childhood riding accident.

Reginald Essenhigh, MP for Newton 1931–1935, who lost a leg in action in World War I in 1917.

Joseph Leckie, MP for Walsall 1931–1938, who became increasingly deaf in office.

John Dugdale, MP for West Bromwich 1941–1963, who was partly deaf from childhood.

Cecil Manning, MP for Camberwell North 1944–1950, who lost his right arm serving in World War I.

Michael Foot, MP for Plymouth Devonport 1945–1955, Ebbw Vale 1960–1983 and Blaenau Gwent 1983–1992, who walked with aid of a stick since car crash injuries in 1963 and was blinded in one eye by an attack of shingles in 1976.

Hervey Rhodes, MP for Ashton under Lyne 1945–1964, who walked with a limp after severe wounding in World War I.

Geoffrey Stevens, MP for Portsmouth Langstone 1950–1964, who became increasingly deaf from 1962.

Iain Macleod, MP for Enfield West 1950–1970, who permanently limped due to a World War II wound in 1940 and later ankylosing spondylitis.

Richard Frederick Wood, MP for Bridlington 1950–1979, who lost both legs in battle in the Middle East in World War II (son of Edward Frederick Lindley Wood, above).

William Rees-Davies, MP for Isle of Thanet 1953–1974 and Thanet West 1974–1983, who lost his right arm in action in World War II.

William Yates, MP for The Wrekin 1955–1966, who lost a leg at the knee in the First Battle of El Alamein.

Julian Critchley, MP for Rochester and Chatham 1959-1964 and Aldershot 1970-1997 who was severely impaired in mobility since before 1992 because of complications of polio suffered when a young man.

John Montagu Douglas Scott, Earl of Dalkeith, MP for Edinburgh North 1960–1973, who was left paralysed chest down after a fox hunting accident in 1971.

Jack Ashley, MP for Stoke-on-Trent South 1966–1992, who became profoundly deaf in 1967 after a routine operation.

Roland Boyes, MP for Houghton and Washington 1983–1997, who suffered from Alzheimer's disease from 1993.

Terry Dicks, MP for Hayes and Harlington 1983–1997, who had cerebral palsy.

Gordon Brown MP for Dunfermline East 1983–2005 and Kirkcaldy and Cowdenbeath 2005–2015, Prime Minister 2007–2010. Blind in left eye since a rugby accident in 1967.

David Maclean, MP for Penrith and The Borders 1983–2010, who has had multiple sclerosis since 1996 (own account).

Emma Nicholson, MP for Devon West and Torridge 1987–1997, who has been deaf since age 16.

David Blunkett, MP for Sheffield Brightside 1987–2010 and Sheffield Brightside and Hillsborough 2010–2015, who has been blind since birth.

Anne Begg, MP for Aberdeen South 1997–2015, who has used a wheelchair since 1984 due to a degenerative disease.

Fiona Mactaggart, MP for Slough 1997–2017, who suffered from multiple sclerosis as early as 2006.

Stephen Lloyd, MP for Eastbourne 2010–2015 and 2017–2019, who is deaf in one ear and has partial hearing in another since measles at age of six.

Robert Halfon, MP for Harlow since 2010, who has cerebral palsy.

Paul Maynard, MP for Blackpool North and Cleveleys since 2010, who has cerebral palsy and a congenital speech defect.

Alec Shelbrooke, MP for Elmet and Rothwell since 2010, who is partially deaf.

Marsha de Cordova, MP for Battersea since 2017, who is registered blind.

Jared O'Mara, MP for Sheffield Hallam 2017–2019, who has cerebral palsy.

Fiona Onasanya, MP for Peterborough 2017–2019, who was diagnosed with multiple sclerosis in 2018.

Jonathan Gullis, MP for Stoke-on-Trent North since 2019, who is deaf in one ear.

Tom Randall, MP for Gedling since 2019, who has had ankylosing spondylitis since age 16.

Members of Parliament who died on wartime active service

Pre-World Wars

First World War

Died after end of hostilities but listed as First World War casualty by Commonwealth War Graves Commission:

Lieutenant-Colonel Sir Mark Sykes, 6th Baronet (5th Battalion The Yorkshire Regiment); born 1879: died 1919 of Spanish influenza at Paris while attending peace negotiations. MP (Conservative Party) for Kingston upon Hull Central (1911-death).

Inter-World Wars

Second World War

Died after end of hostilities but listed as Second World Casualty by Commonwealth War Graves Commission:

Admiral of the Fleet Sir Roger Keyes, 1st Baronet, later 1st Baron Keyes of Zeebrugge (Royal Navy); born 1872; died 1945 of effects of smoke inhalation sustained in a Japanese aircraft attack when visiting  during a government goodwill tour over 1944–45. MP (Conservative Party) for Portsmouth North (1934–43).

Members of Parliament who died as wartime civilian casualties

Members of Parliament who have been accidentally killed

Members of Parliament who have been killed in a duel

Members of Parliament who have been murdered

Members of Parliament who have died by suicide

The Irish republican Bobby Sands died while on hunger strike in May 1981; he had been elected as an "Anti-H-Block" MP for Fermanagh and South Tyrone in April 1981, although he never took his seat as he was in prison. Although hunger strike deaths are arguably self-inflicted, they are not conventually considered "suicides."

Members of Parliament who have disappeared

Members of Parliament who were executed, died in prison or escaped justice

See also
 Parliamentary records of the United Kingdom
 United Kingdom general election records
 United Kingdom by-election records
 Records of Prime Ministers of the United Kingdom
 Oldest living Prime Minister of the United Kingdom
 List of military veterans in British politics

References

Members of Parliament